The following television stations operate on virtual channel 4 in Mexico:

Regional networks
TV4 in the state of Guanajuato
Radio y Televisión de Guerrero in the state of Guerrero
Sistema Quintanarroense de Comunicación Social in the state of Quintana Roo

Local stations
XHBC-TDT in Mexicali, Baja California
XHBR-TDT in Nuevo Laredo, Tamaulipas
XHCCA-TDT in Campeche, Campeche
XHGK-TDT in Tapachula, Chiapas
XHTV-TDT in Mexico City
XHUAD-TDT in Durango, Durango

XHG-TDT in Guadalajara, Jalisco
XHKG-TDT in Tepic, Nayarit
XEFB-TDT in Monterrey, Nuevo León
XHBO-TDT in Oaxaca, Oaxaca
XHP-TDT in Puebla, Puebla
XHROSL-TDT in San Luis Potosí, San Luis Potosí
XHS-TDT in Ensenada, Baja California
XHST-TDT in Mérida, Yucatán
XHTPZ-TDT in Tampico, Tamaulipas

References

04 virtual